Gonioctena pallida is a species of leaf beetle native to Europe.

References

External links
Images representing Gonioctena at BOLD

Chrysomelinae
Beetles described in 1758
Taxa named by Carl Linnaeus
Beetles of Europe